The playoffs of the 2014–15 Champions Hockey League were played on 4 November 2014 and concluded on 3 February 2015 with the final. A total of 16 teams competed in the playoffs which were drawn on 10 October 2014.

All times are CET (UTC+1).

Round and draw dates
The playoffs were drawn on 10 October 2014 in Helsinki, Finland and the entire playoff bracket was determined in the draw.

Format
The eleven group winners and the five best group runners-up qualified for the playoffs, which will begin on 4 November 2014 and end with the final on 3 February 2015. It will be played as a single-elimination tournament, meaning that the losing teams in each round are eliminated from the tournament. The teams will play against each other over two legs on a home-and-away basis with the team with the better standing after the group stage having the second game at home, except for the one-match final played at the venue of the team with the best competition track record leading up to the final.

If the aggregate score after the two legs are equal the match will be decided in 10-minute overtime. If no goals were scored during overtime, the tie will be decided by penalty shootout. In the final, which was played as a single match, if scores are level at the end of normal time, there will be 20 minutes of overtime, followed by penalty shoot-out if scores remained tied.

The mechanism of the draw for playoffs was as follows:
The entire playoff was drawn at a single occasion on 10 October 2014 to determine the eight pairings for the eighth-finals. After this draw, all games up to the final are set in brackets.
In the draw for the eighth-finals, the eight best group winners were seeded, and the three group winners with worst record and the five best runners-up were unseeded. The seeded teams were drawn against the unseeded teams, with the seeded teams hosting the second leg. Teams from the same group could not be drawn against each other.

Qualified teams
Eleven group winners and eight runners-up enter the playoffs and the eight group winners with the best group stage record were seeded in the eighth-finals. From quarter-finals and onwards there were no seeding.

The table is ordered by seeding order for the draw which is group position followed by points and goal differential.

Bracket

Note:
The teams listed on top of each tie play first match at home and the bottom team plays second match at home.

Eighth-finals
The draw for the entire playoff (eighth-finals, quarter-finals, semi-finals and final) was held on 10 October 2014. The first legs were played on 4 November, and the second legs were played on 11 November 2014.

|}

Notes

First leg

Second leg

Quarter-finals
The first legs were played on 2 December, and the second legs were played on 9 December 2014.

|}

First leg

Second leg

Semi-finals
The first legs were played on 13 January, and the second legs were played on 20 January 2015.

|}

First leg

Second leg

Final

The final was played on 3 February 2015 at the venue of the team with the best competition track record leading up to the final.

References

External links
Champions Hockey League

playoffs